"Une souris verte" ("A Green Mouse"), is a children's song, very well known in France, dating back to the 18th century or the end of the 17th century.

There are many variations of the ending of this song.

Uncertain origin 

This anonymous song, well known in all regions of France and several other francophone countries, appears to date back to the late 17th century or the beginning of the 18th century.

Lyrics 
Une souris verte
Qui courait dans l'herbe
Je l'attrape par la queue,
Je la montre à ces messieurs
Ces messieurs me disent :
Trempez-la dans l'huile,
Trempez-la dans l'eau,
Ça fera un escargot, tout chaud.

Je la mets dans un tiroir
Elle me dit qu'il fait trop noir (1)Je la mets dans mon chapeau,
Elle me dit qu'il fait trop chaud (2)Je la mets dans ma culotte,
Elle me fait trois petites crottes. (3) 
Je la mets dans ma mains,
Elle me dit qu'il fait très bien. (4) Version 1 (2) and furtherJe l’envoie dans son école
Elle me dit j’en ai ras l'bolJe la mets dans son p'tit lit
Elle me dit j'dois faire pipiJe la mets sur un cheval 
Elle me dit joyeux carnaval.

 Version 2 (3)Je la mets sur un coussin,
Elle me dit qu'elle est très bien.

Je la mets dans mon p'tit lit                                                                                                                                            
Elle me dit moi j'reste ici !

 Version 3 (3) and furtherJe la mets dans mes grandes poches
Elle me dit elles sont trop mochesJe la mets dans ma chemise
Elle me fait trois petites bises

Je la mets dans ma culotte
Elle me fait trois petites crottes !

Je la mets dans mon jardin
Elle me dit qu'elle s'y sent bien

 Version 4 after (3)Je la mets là dans ma main,
Ell' me dit qu'elle est très bien.

Je la mets dans ma cuisine,
Ell' me mange tout' la farine.

Oh ! La coquine !

 Version 5 (1) and (2) in reverse order Another version after "Tout chaud."''
 La cuillère à pot
 Dans la rue Carnot
 Numéro zéro.

References

External links

Versions by date 
 1888 (p. 468): link
 1890 (p. 198): link
 1892 (p. 234): link
 1936 (p. 187): link

French children's songs
Fictional mice and rats
Songs about mice and rats
18th-century songs
Songwriter unknown
Year of song unknown
French folklore